Zoom is a Ukrainian youth entertainment television channel. The channel began broadcasting June 1, 2013 at the former frequency channel of MTV Ukraine.

Content is broadcast in Ukrainian. The channel can be received in the territory of Ukraine on digital terrestrial television DVB-T2 (nationwide multiplex MX-2), and also via cable television, where Zoom, under the relevant contracts and licenses, replaced MTV Ukraine. Abroad, the channel reception is available by the AMOS-3 satellite.

The channel is part of GDF Media Limited, owned by Dmytro Firtash.

References

Ukrainian brands
Television stations in Ukraine
Ukrainian-language television stations in Ukraine
Television channels and stations established in 2013